Ruchun-e Olya (also Romanized as Rūchūn-e ‘Olyā; also known as Rūchūn-e Bālā) is a village in Pariz Rural District, Pariz District, Sirjan County, Kerman Province, Iran. At the 2006 census, its population was 112, in 25 families.

References 

Populated places in Sirjan County